Valley Airport  is located adjacent to the Trans-Canada Highway (Highway 104) in Valley, Nova Scotia, Canada, several kilometres northeast of Truro. The aerodrome was listed as closed in the Canada Flight Supplement dated 10 April 2008.

References

Buildings and structures in Colchester County
Defunct airports in Nova Scotia
Transport in Colchester County
Truro, Nova Scotia